was a Japanese middle-distance runner. He competed in the men's 3000 metres steeplechase at the 1964 Summer Olympics.

References

External links
 

1937 births
2021 deaths
Place of birth missing
Japanese male middle-distance runners
Japanese male steeplechase runners
Olympic male steeplechase runners
Olympic athletes of Japan
Athletes (track and field) at the 1964 Summer Olympics
Asian Games bronze medalists for Japan
Asian Games medalists in athletics (track and field)
Athletes (track and field) at the 1962 Asian Games
Medalists at the 1962 Asian Games
Japan Championships in Athletics winners
Sportspeople from Tochigi Prefecture
20th-century Japanese people
21st-century Japanese people